Martin John Horton (21 April 1934 – 3 April 2011) was an English cricketer, who played in two Tests in 1959.  He was born in Worcester, England, and played the bulk of his first-class cricket for his native county.

Cricket writer, Colin Bateman, noted that Horton was, "a versatile all-rounder who could bat anywhere in the top six and who twice took more than 100 wickets in a season with his off-spin...".

Life and career
Horton made his debut for Worcestershire in 1952, and was an integral part of the side which won the County Championship in 1964 (for the first time in the county's history) and 1965. He passed 1,000 runs in a season on 11 occasions, scoring 2,468 runs in 1959, the year he won his two Test caps.  He scored a half century against India in his first Test and took 2 for 24 in his second. He was dropped from the side, never to return.  He achieved the double in 1955 and 1961, and he took 9 for 56 against the 1955 South Africans.  In nearly two decades of cricket, he took 825 first-class wickets in all and scored 23 centuries with the bat.

In late 1966, Horton moved to New Zealand to begin a five-year contract as the national team's coach, a position he eventually held for seventeen seasons. He also played four seasons in the Plunket Shield with Northern Districts from 1967–68 to 1970–71. He returned to England in 1983 to become cricket coach at the Royal Grammar School, a post he held until 1996. He also became chairman of Worcestershire County Cricket Club.

Horton died following a long illness in April 2011.

References
Notes

Sources
Daily Telegraph obituary Retrieved 10 Apr 2011

External links

1934 births
2011 deaths
English cricket coaches
England Test cricketers
Northern Districts cricketers
Worcestershire cricketers
Combined Services cricketers
International Cavaliers cricketers
Players cricketers
Marylebone Cricket Club cricketers
North v South cricketers